Massimo Quinto Foschi (born 2 January 1938) is an Italian actor and voice actor.

Biography
Born in Forlì, Foschi began his career as an actor at some point during the 1960s. He appeared in over 22 films since 1966 and also worked extensively as a theatre actor alongside colleagues such as Lamberto Puggelli and Ottavia Piccolo. On screen, his major role was in the 1977 film Jungle Holocaust and he often made collaborations with Gian Maria Volonté.

Foschi also works as a voice actor. He is famous locally and worldwide for voicing Darth Vader in the Italian dub of the Star Wars film franchise. One of his earliest appearances as a voice actor is in the 1965 redub of Orson Welles' Citizen Kane, in which he dubbed several background characters. Foschi dubbed Gregory Peck, Alan Rickman, Donald Sutherland, Rutger Hauer, Laurence Olivier and Lance Henriksen in a select number of their movies.

Personal life
Foschi is the father of actor Marco Foschi (born 1977).

Filmography

Cinema
Be Sick... It's Free (1968)
Investigation of a Citizen Above Suspicion (1970)
La signora delle camelie (1971)
Brother Sun, Sister Moon (1972)
Giordano Bruno (1973)
La Cecilia (1974)
 Young Lucrezia (1974)
L'Orlando Furioso (1975)
Holocaust 2000 (1977)
La tigre è ancora viva: Sandokan alla riscossa! (1977)
Jungle Holocaust (1977)
Nine Guests for a Crime (1977)
Men or Not Men (1980)
Il Principe di Homburg (1983)
Notti e Nebbie (1984)
Otello (1986)
Tartarughe dal becco d'ascia (2000)
Italian Dream (2008)
Pandemia (2011)
The Ideal City (2012)
Una nobile causa (2016)

Television
Il primogenito (1964)
Vita di Dante (1965)
Processo di famiglia (1968)
Cocktail Party (1969)
Le mani sporche (1978)
The Merchant of Venice (1979)

Dubbing roles

Animation
Plenipotentiary in Space Pirate Captain Harlock

Live action
Darth Vader in Star Wars: Episode IV – A New Hope
Darth Vader in Star Wars: Episode V – The Empire Strikes Back
Darth Vader in Star Wars: Episode VI – Return of the Jedi
Darth Vader in Star Wars: Episode III – Revenge of the Sith
Darth Vader in Rogue One: A Star Wars Story
President Coriolanus Snow in The Hunger Games
President Coriolanus Snow in The Hunger Games: Catching Fire
President Coriolanus Snow in The Hunger Games: Mockingjay – Part 1
President Coriolanus Snow in The Hunger Games: Mockingjay – Part 2
Robert Thorn in The Omen
Nimrod in The Bible: In the Beginning...
Etienne of Navarre in Ladyhawke
Winston Zeddemore in Ghostbusters
The Monster in Young Frankenstein
Muhammad Ahmad in Khartoum
Hans Gruber in Die Hard
Bishop in Aliens
Leon Trotsky in The Assassination of Trotsky
Cadet Moses Hightower in Police Academy
Cadet Moses Hightower in Police Academy 2: Their First Assignment
John "Dr. Death" Bishop in Child's Play
Ben Richards in The Running Man
Homer Simpson in The Day of the Locust

References

External links

1938 births
Living people
People from Forlì
Italian male voice actors
Italian male stage actors
Italian male television actors
Italian male film actors
20th-century Italian male actors
21st-century Italian male actors